Souvik Chakrabarti (born 12 July 1991), is an Indian professional footballer who plays as a midfielder or defender for Indian Super League club East Bengal.

Career

Mohun Bagan
Chakraborty started playing football at the age of eight at the Yubajagaran football coaching centre. He then joined the Mohun Bagan Academy when he was 15 years old where he recalls his most memorable moment there, the Manchester United Premier Cup in Manchester, England. Chakraborty was then selected to join the first-team for the 2009–10 Indian Federation Cup and the Calcutta Football League. His call-up to the senior team was made possible due to the rule that each club in the Calcutta Football League must have 2 under-19 players in the squad. Chakraborty had to wait till 2 November 2011 before making his professional debut for the club against Dempo at the Fatorda Stadium in which Mohun Bagan lost 5–0, coming on as a 26th-minute substitute for Anwar Ali.

Air India
In the summer of 2012 Chakraborty signed for Air India of the I-League and scored his first professional goal of his career for the club on 28 August 2012 against Pailan Arrows during the 2012 Durand Cup. He made his I-League debut for Air India on 7 October 2012 against Prayag United S.C. in which Air India lost 5–1. He scored his second goal for Air India in the I-League against Shillong Lajong on 16 December 2012 to give Air India the lead 1–0 before the match ended 1–1 after Lajong found an equalizer.

United Sports Club
Souvik made his debut on 6 October 2013 against Bengaluru at the Salt Lake Stadium in which he played till 61minutes and was replaced by Snehasish Chakraborty as United lost the match 1–0.

Mohun Bagan
In January 2014, Chakraborty signed for Kolkata giant Mohun Bagan. A Mohun Bagan Academy product, he is very much a mariner at heart. Having devoted his life to football, Souvik has turned into a master passer and crosser of the ball. A good passer, crosser, and modern box to box midfielder, Souvik was a vital cog in Bagan's I-League triumph in 2014–15 season. 
On 21 May 2016, Souvik started on the right of midfield in Mohun Bagan's 2016 Indian Federation Cup Final victory over Aizawl FC before being substituted in the 88th minute.
On 28 February 2017, Souvik started as the captain for the first time for Mohun Bagan in the AFC Cup against Club Valencia.

Delhi Dynamos (loan)
In August 2014, Delhi based ISL franchisee Delhi Dynamos signed him in domestic draft. He made total 7 ISL appearances for Delhi Dynamos in first season, but unfortunately Delhi finished fifth in final League table.

In June 2015, Delhi Dynamos retained him for next season ISL along with 4 more players. He is highly rated by Roberto Carlos in Delhi Dynamos where he played almost all matches for a right back for Delhi dynamos in 2015 season. He helped Delhi to reach semi final, in which Delhi lost 3–1 to FC Goa.

In July 2016, Delhi Dynamos again retained him for next season ISL for the third straight time. Delhi Dynamos sent Souvik to A-League club Central Coast Mariners for a week long training camp. Delhi Dynamos head coach Gianluca Zambrotta rated Souvik a versatile player and used him as a left back in entire season. Souvik started all matches for Delhi Dynamos in 2016 campaign.

Jamshedpur
On 23 July 2017, Chakraborty was selected in the fourth round of the 2017–18 ISL Players Draft by Jamshedpur for the 2017–18 Indian Super League season.  He made his debut for the club during the first ever match on 18 November 2017 against NorthEast United. He started and played the whole match as Jamshedpur drew 0–0.

Career statistics

Club

Honours
Air India
Durand Cup: 2012

Mohun Bagan
I-League: 2014–15
Federation Cup: 2015–16

Hyderabad FC
Indian Super League: 2021–22

References

External links
 Jamshedpur FC Profile

1987 births
Living people
Footballers from Kolkata
Association football midfielders
I-League players
Indian footballers
Mohun Bagan AC players
Air India FC players
United SC players
Odisha FC players
Jamshedpur FC players
Indian Super League players
Mumbai City FC players
Hyderabad FC players